Susanne Helene Ford (19 March 19436 November 2009) was an Australian feminist photographer who started her arts practice in the 1960s. She was the first Australian photographer to have a solo exhibition at the National Gallery of Victoria in 1974 with Time Series. A book of her portraits of women 'A Sixtieth of a Second' was published in 1987. Her photographs and eclectic practice was displayed in an exhibition at the National Gallery of Victoria in 2014.

Biography
Sue Ford was born Susanne Helene Winslow on 19 March 1943, in St Kilda, Melbourne, Victoria. She was an Australian feminist photographer. Ford had a continuing interest in Indigenous issues, travelling widely and photographing in remote areas of Central Australia.  In 1988, she travelled to Bathurst Island, Northern Territory, to conduct photography workshops with Tiwi women. She moved between Bathurst Island and the Barunga Festival (Northern Territory, Sydney and Melbourne) to photograph events connected to the bicentenary of Australia. Between 1990 and 1992, Ford's process shifted from direct camera work to a series of collage images. Each collage was gridded up and each grab section later printed at A3 size to create large format grid images. She also worked with a series of ink and watercolour paintings related to her impression of the Cook Islands, Bathurst Island and the deserts in NT. In 1991 Ford bought a house in Marlborough Street, Balaclava, Melbourne where she lived until 2009. She made a second trip to Bathurst Island to work with the Tiwi women in the same year. Ford died in 2009 in her Balaclava home on 6 November, surrounded by her family and friends. In 2010, the Sue Ford archive was established. In 2011 Ford's last major body of work Self Portrait with a Camera, 1960–2006, was exhibited at Monash Gallery of Art, Melbourne. It involves a conflation and compression of time. It includes some of Ford's earliest photographs alongside her most recent and deeply personal yet ordered and objective at the same time. The earliest photographs in the series are from when Ford was first introduced to the camera.

Early life
The earliest photographs are from when Ford was first introduced to the camera. Ford was given her first camera in her late teens to take with her on a family holiday to Europe. It was on her return in 1961 that Ford found employment as a delivery girl for Sutcliffe photographers in Melbourne and working as a darkroom assistant. In 1962, she enrolled in a photography course at RMIT, she was only one of two females in a class of thirty students. Ford completed only the first year of a three-year course. She then rented a studio in Little Collins street, Melbourne with a friend Annette Stephens, a fellow RMIT student and friend. This was above a small cafe. Ford also documented her children extensively and experimented with concepts for children's books, pairing images and text in imaginative narrative sequences that were often connected by a theme of escape. In the late 1960s Ford created several bodies of work that contained simplex montages, photograms and layers negatives, received hours of darkroom experimentation. The photo collage Man off the moon, c. 1969 critiqued the first moonwalk by NASA astronauts Neil Armstrong and Buzz Aldrin. Using images shot on a television screen, Ford places her hand into the scene, directing the astronauts like a puppet in a way that asserts her own presence and questions intention of the Americans on the lunar landscape.

Family life
Ford moved to Dunmoochin, Cottlesbridge for a brief period, then to Laughing Waters Road, Eltham with her spouse Gordon Ford. Their first home was destroyed by bushfire, and they then moved to Pitt Street in Eltham and built a mud brick studio there including a darkroom, they also conducted a short lived child portrait business at the same time as working for Eltham Film Productions. In 1967 her daughter Emma Ford was born. Then in 1968, her son Ben Ford was born. In 1970, Gordon built a new mud brick house for the family at Laughing Waters Road. In 1972 they moved into the new mud brick house at Laughing Waters Road. In 1975 Ford moved to Sydney, but travelled regularly back to Melbourne. In 1980, they returned to North Carlton, Melbourne. At this time Ford was active as a founding member of Reel Women feminist filmmakers. Ford was a member of other feminist film co-operatives over her career, including: the Feminist Film Workers collective (1970s and 1980s) and the Women’s Film Unit in 1985.

Personal life
In 1982, Ford suffered a serious horse riding accident that resulted in a back injury; as a result Ford could not photograph for some time and commenced painting. Living in Williamstown from 1983 to 1985, Victoria. Melbourne. Ford travelled each winter to Byron Bay, NSW, making many friends and working on art projects. Ford dropped out of RMIT due to sexual harassment in the darkroom during her first year. She constantly turned the camera on herself, her family, friends and acquaintances for social and political ends. Her experimentation with technique and media including not only photography but film, video, painting, drawing and later printing was also connected, from the very beginning, by interest in the politics of representation. She also studied at the Victorian College of Arts (VCA) 1973–1974. In 1974, the NGV's display of Time Series 1962–74 constituted the first solo exhibition by an Australian photographer.

Education and Career 
Ford was one of two female to commence photographic studies in the newly established Certificate of Photography course at Royal Melbourne Institute of Technology in 1960. In 1962 she ran a photographic studio with her friend Annette Stephens. In 1973 she was awarded an Ilford Scholarship that provided for her to attend the Victorian College of the Arts for postgraduate study from 1973–1974 in Melbourne. 

Documentation of Sue Ford's work can be found at the Women's Art Register.

Exhibitions

2004

 Solo Exhibitions
 Watter's Gallery, Sydney.

 Group Exhibitions
NGV, Melbourne.
National Library of Australia, Canberra

2003

Solo Exhibitions
 ARC ONE-Span, Melbourne

Group Exhibitions
NGV, Melbourne
Australian Centre for the Moving Image, Melbourne

2002

Solo Exhibitions
ARC ONE-Span, Melbourne

Grants
 Arts Victoria grant for the continuum series
 Melbourne City Council grant for continuum large-scale digital prints

 Group Exhibitions
 Fieldwork: Australia Art 1968–2002, NGV, Melbourne
 Berlin Film Festival, Germany

2000

 Group Exhibitions
 National Portrait Gallery, Canberra
 Art Gallery of NSW, Sydney
 Australian Centre for the Moving Image, Melbourne

1999

 Group Exhibitions
 Institute of Modern Art, Brisbane
 Heide Museum of Modern Art, Melbourne

 Solo Exhibitions
 Somewhere in France 1917 
Watter's Gallery, Sydney; 
Parliament House, Canberra

1998

Group Exhibitions
 National Gallery of Victoria, Melbourne
 Monash University Gallery of Art, Melbourne

 Solo Exhibitions
 Queensland Art Gallery, Brisbane

1997

 Solo Exhibition
 Australian Centre for Photography, Sydney

1995

 Solo Exhibitions
 Watter's Gallery Sydney
 Monash University Gallery, Melbourne

 Group Exhibitions
 Watter's Gallery, Sydney
 National Gallery of Australia, Canberra
 Museum of the Northern Territory, Darwin
 Queensland Art Gallery, Brisbane

1994

 Solo Exhibition – Time Surfaces – Colour Laser Prints by Sue Ford – National Gallery of Victoria, Melbourne

Group Exhibition
 Pictograms: Aspects of Contemporary Photographic Practice
Touring Exhibition throughout Australia

1993

Group Exhibition
From the Empire's End: Nine Australian and Spanish Photographers, Bathurst Regional Gallery

1972
 Film Woman in a House (1972)

 Van Diemans Land to Video Land – An Exhibition of Colour Lazer Prints, and Paintings by Sue Ford

1971
Solo Exhibition – Metamorphoses Series, Hawthorn City Art Gallery, Yellow House, Sydney

1969
 Suburban Series of collaged photographs

References

Australian feminists
Australian photographers
1943 births
2009 deaths
Photographers from Melbourne
People from St Kilda, Victoria